May Oung (also spelt May Aung; 6 January 1880 - 5 June 1926) was a Burmese legal scholar, judge and politician who served as Minister of Home Affairs during the colonial era. He was known for his expertise in Burmese Buddhist law and one of the founders of the Young Men's Buddhist Association Burma.

May Oung was the first law professor at Yangon University.

Early life and education
May Oung was born on 6 January 1880 in Sittwe to parents Tha Do Phyu and Hnaung Dway, the second eldest of three sons. His parents died when May Oung was a child, so he was raised by his mother's brother, Hla Aung and his wife, Mya May, who sent him to India for his formative education. He studied law at the University of Cambridge from 1904 and 1907, and pursued an LLM at Cambridge in 1922.

Career
He was one of only two Burmese judges appointed to the High Court when it was established by the British administration in 1922.

References

1880 births
1926 deaths
Academic staff of the University of Yangon
British Burma judges
Alumni of the University of Cambridge